Schweers is a surname. Notable people with the surname include:

Chelsie Schweers (born 1989), American basketball player
Lion Schweers (born 1996), German footballer
Verena Schweers (born 1989), German footballer

See also
Schwiers